CSI: Crime Scene Investigation, also referred to as CSI and CSI: Las Vegas, is an American procedural forensics crime drama television series that ran on CBS from October 6, 2000, to September 27, 2015, spanning 15 seasons. This was the first in the CSI franchise, and starred William Petersen, Marg Helgenberger, Gary Dourdan, George Eads, Jorja Fox, Ted Danson, Laurence Fishburne, Elisabeth Shue and Paul Guilfoyle. The series concluded with a feature-length finale, "Immortality". A follow-up series, CSI: Vegas, premiered in 2021.

Premise
Mixing deduction and character-driven drama, CSI: Crime Scene Investigation follows a team of crime-scene investigators employed by the Las Vegas Police Department as they use physical evidence to solve murders.

The team is originally led by Dr. Gil Grissom (Petersen), a socially awkward forensic entomologist and career criminalist who is promoted to CSI supervisor following the death of a trainee investigator. Grissom's second-in-command, Catherine Willows (Marg Helgenberger), is a single mother with a cop's instinct. Born and raised in Las Vegas, Catherine was a stripper before being recruited into law enforcement and trained as a blood-spatter specialist.

Following Grissom's departure during the ninth season of the series, Catherine is promoted to supervisor. After overseeing the training of new investigator Raymond Langston (Fishburne), Willows is replaced by D.B. Russell (Danson) and recruited to the FBI shortly thereafter. Russell is a family man, a keen forensic botanist, and a veteran of the Seattle Crime Lab.

In the series' twelfth season, Russell is reunited with his former partner Julie Finlay (Elisabeth Shue), who, like Catherine, is a blood-spatter expert with an extensive knowledge of criminal psychology. With the rest of the team, they work to tackle Las Vegas's growing crime rate and are on the job 24/7, scouring the scene, collecting the evidence, and finding the missing pieces that will solve the mystery.

Creation

Concept and development 
During the 1990s, Anthony Zuiker caught producer Jerry Bruckheimer's attention after writing his first movie script. Zuiker was convinced that a series was in the concept; Bruckheimer agreed and began developing the series with Touchstone Television. The studio's head at the time liked the spec script and presented it to ABC, NBC, and Fox executives, who decided to pass.

The head of drama development at CBS saw potential in the script, and the network had a pay-or-play contract with actor William Petersen, who said he wanted to do the CSI pilot. The network's executives liked the pilot so much, they decided to include it in their 2000 schedule immediately, airing on Fridays after The Fugitive.

After CBS picked up the show, the Disney-owned Touchstone decided to pull out of the project, as they didn't want to spend so much money producing a show for another network (ABC is also owned by Disney). Instead of the intended effect of making CBS cancel the show (since it no longer had a producer), Bruckheimer was able to convince Alliance Atlantis to step in as a producer, saving the show and adding CBS as another producer.

Initially, CSI was thought to benefit from The Fugitive (a remake of the 1960s series), which was expected to be a hit, but by the end of 2000, CSI had a much larger audience.
The show began on Friday at 9:00 following The Fugitive, premiering on October 6, 2000, with an impressive 5.4 in the 18-49 demo and 17 million viewers. The show hovered around that mark for the next 10 episodes. The final Friday episode, "I-15 Murders" aired on January 12, 2001. The show moved to Thursday at 9:00 following Survivor on February 1, 2001, episode "Fahrenheit 932" and remained in that time slot until Season 11.

Production 
CSI: Crime Scene Investigation was produced by Jerry Bruckheimer Television and CBS Productions, which became CBS Paramount Television in the fall of 2006 and CBS Television Studios three years later. Formerly a co-production with the now-defunct Alliance Atlantis Communications, that company's interest was later bought by the investment firm GS Capital Partners, an affiliate of Goldman Sachs. CBS acquired AAC's international distribution rights to the program, though the non-US DVD distribution rights did not change (for example, Momentum Pictures continues to own UK DVD rights). The series is currently in syndication, and reruns are broadcast in the US on Oxygen, Syfy, and the USA Network on cable, with Court TV Mystery holding the broadcast syndication rights. The show has aired in reruns on the USA Network since January 14, 2011. The CSI catalog has been exclusive to the whole NBC Universal portfolio since September 2014, after several years with Viacom Media Networks' Spike and TV Land.

Filming locations

CSI was originally shot at Rye Canyon, a corporate campus owned by Lockheed Martin situated in the Valencia area of Santa Clarita, California, due to the Santa Clarita Valley's strong similarity to the outskirts of Las Vegas; after episode 11, filming shifted to the nearby Santa Clarita Studios. Occasionally, the cast still shot on location in Las Vegas (the season-four DVD set revealed that the episode "Suckers" was mostly shot during December 2003 in Las Vegas, where they filmed a Gothic club scene on location for rent, and in January 2004, some scenes were filmed at Caesars Palace), although Las Vegas was primarily used for second unit photography such as exterior shots of streets. Other California locations include Verdugo Hills High School, UCLA's Royce Hall, Pasadena City Hall, and California State University, Los Angeles. After season five, CSI episodes were primarily filmed at Universal Studios Hollywood in Universal City, California, but since Santa Clarita's surroundings had proven so versatile, CSI continued to shoot some outdoor scenes there.

Music
CSI's theme song was "Who Are You", written by Pete Townshend with vocals by lead singer Roger Daltrey of The Who. Daltrey made a special appearance in the season-seven episode "Living Legend", which also contained many musical references such as the words "Who's next" on a dry-erase board in the episode's opening sequence. In certain countries, to avoid music licensing fees, a unique theme was used, instead.

Throughout the series, music played an important role; artists such as Ozzy Osbourne, The Wallflowers, John Mayer, and Akon (with Obie Trice) performed onscreen in the episodes "Skin in the Game", "The Accused Is Entitled", "Built to Kill, Part 1", and "Poppin' Tags", respectively. Mogwai was often heard during scenes showing forensic tests in progress, as were Radiohead and Cocteau Twins, but several other artists lent their music to CSI, including Rammstein and Linkin Park—used heavily in Lady Heather's story arc. Sigur Rós can be heard playing in the background in the episode "Slaves of Las Vegas", The Turtles in "Grave Danger", and Marilyn Manson in "Suckers". A cover of the Tears for Fears song "Mad World", arranged by Michael Andrews and featuring vocals by Gary Jules, was used in the pilot episode and during three episodes of season six ("Room Service", "Killer", and "Way to Go"). Industrial rock band Nine Inch Nails was also featured multiple times throughout the three series. One episode started with The Velvet Underground's excited rendition of "Sweet Jane" and ended with the downbeat version of Cowboy Junkies' revision of the song. Character David Hodges' good luck has, on occasion, been accompanied by Electric Light Orchestra's "Mr. Blue Sky". This song was first used in the season seven episode "Lab Rats" and last used during season ten's "Field Mice".

Several songs by band New Order were used in separate seasons of the show. Their hit "Crystal" even appears as the third track on the official CSI: The Soundtrack, promoted in the Special Features DVD of Season 1. "Someone Like You", which appears on the same album as "Crystal", appears in a Season 8 episode.

Several songs from Home Video appeared in the show as well. "Blimp Mason", "We", and "Melon" all appeared once at one point in the season, in their own episodes and seasons.

Cast and characters

 William Petersen as Gil Grissom, the graveyard shift CSI supervisor (regular: seasons 1–9 (until episode 10, "One to Go"); guest star: seasons 9, 11, 13, "Immortality")  Grissom is a highly respected forensic entomologist with a doctoral degree in biology from the University of California. When testifying in court he is often addressed as "Doctor Grissom". He became a CSI around 1985 and departed the Las Vegas Crime Lab in 2009. After a short stint as a researcher, Grissom becomes a sea-life advocate and reunites with his ex-wife Sara. The series ends with the two sailing off together from the Port of San Diego.
 Marg Helgenberger as Catherine Willows, the graveyard shift CSI assistant supervisor (regular: seasons 1–12 (until episode 12, "Willows in the Wind"); guest star: season 14, "Immortality") Catherine is a blood-spatter analyst who joined the CSI team as a lab technician and worked her way up to assistant supervisor, later succeeding Grissom. After a stint as the graveyard shift CSI supervisor, Catherine is demoted following a departmental scandal, and later leaves Las Vegas to join the FBI as a special agent. During the series finale, a recently returned Willows is granted the directorship of the crime lab when Sidle leaves Las Vegas.
 Gary Dourdan as Warrick Brown, a CSI level III (regular: seasons 1–9 (until episode 1, "For Warrick") Warrick is an audio-video analyst and a native of Las Vegas with a major in chemistry from the University of Nevada, Las Vegas. A recovering gambling addict, Warrick is nonetheless skilled at his job. After being falsely accused, and acquitted, of murder, Brown is assassinated in his car by a corrupt high ranking policeman, Undersheriff Jeffrey McKeen. He dies in Grissom's arms.
 George Eads as Nick Stokes, a CSI level III (regular: seasons 1–15)Stokes graduated from Texas A&M and joined the Dallas Police prior to moving to Las Vegas. He was promoted to CSI level III in the pilot episode of the series and later became assistant night supervisor under Catherine Willows. Stokes was later demoted, and after remaining in Las Vegas a CSI III, he transfers to San Diego when he is granted the directorship of the SDPD Crime Lab.
 Jorja Fox as Sara Sidle, a CSI level III (regular: seasons 1 (from episode 2 "Cool Change")–8 (until episode 7, "Goodbye & Good Luck"), 11–15, "Immortality"; recurring: seasons 9 (occasionally), 10 (regularly as Special Guest Star)) Sara is a materials and element analyst who majored in physics at Harvard University. Sara transferred from San Francisco at the behest of Grissom, whom she later marries. After a turbulent relationship and a divorce, Sara is promoted to director of the Las Vegas Crime Lab, though she relinquishes this position to reunite with her ex-husband, Grissom. Catherine then succeeds her as lab director.
 Eric Szmanda as Greg Sanders, a CSI level III (regular: seasons 3–15, "Immortality"; recurring: seasons 1–2) Greg is a DNA specialist who was educated in a private school for gifted students. Graduating Phi Beta Kappa from Stanford, Sanders joined the LVPD after a short stint with the SFPD. He later wrote a book about the history of Las Vegas. Greg believes in psychic powers, and is willing to sacrifice himself for what is right. Over the course of the series, Greg has several love interests. He expressed a romantic interest in fellow CSI Morgan Brody after meeting her in season 12.
 Robert David Hall as Dr. Albert "Al" Robbins, the chief medical examiner (regular: seasons 3–15, "Immortality"; recurring: seasons 1–2) Robbins is the head county coroner of the LVPD. He is married with three children and has prosthetic legs, having lost his own legs after being hit by a drunk driver as a teenager. Al rarely leaves the crime lab, instead performing autopsies and referring specimens for forensic analysis. He forms strong bonds with both Gil Grissom and Raymond Langston.
 Paul Guilfoyle as LVPD Captain Jim Brass, homicide detective captain (regular: seasons 1–14, "Immortality")Brass was initially the CSI team's supervisor until losing the position after Holly Gribbs, a rookie CSI under his command, is murdered on her first day on the job. He is then given a position as a homicide detective; from then on, Brass serves as the legal muscle for the CSI team and the one who does most of the arresting and interrogating of suspects. Brass later retires from the force to focus on his daughter, and takes a job at Catherine's casino, The Eclipse, as head of security, as seen in "Immortality".
 Louise Lombard as Sofia Curtis, the LVPD's deputy chief (regular: season 7; recurring: seasons 5–6; guest star: seasons 8, 11) Sofia was a CSI who became assistant supervisor on graveyard, following a demotion from supervisor at the behest of Conrad Ecklie. She later makes a career switch to detective, working alongside Brass, and, rapidly rises through the ranks and becomes the LVPD's deputy chief. She develops a strong friendship with Grissom, much to the chagrin of Sara.
 Wallace Langham as David Hodges, a trace technician (regular: seasons 8–15, "Immortality"; recurring: seasons 3–7)  Hodges is a lab technician with a BA from Williams College; he previously worked in the LAPD crime lab, where his superiors felt he had an attitude problem. Hodges has an uncanny sense of smell, and is able to identify many key chemical compounds by their scent alone. Although shown to be a loner throughout the series, he forms a close bond with Morgan Brody.
 Lauren Lee Smith as Riley Adams, a CSI level II (regular: season 9 (from episode 3, "Art Imitates Life")  Adams is a former St. Louis police officer and a nonconformist who joined law enforcement to rebel against her parents, who are psychiatrists. She fits in well with the team initially, though this seems to stop following Grissom's departure. Unhappy with the new leadership of Willows, she departs Las Vegas, leaving a damning exit interview criticizing Catherine's leadership skills.
 Laurence Fishburne as Dr. Raymond "Ray" Langston, a CSI level II (regular: seasons 9 (from episode 11, "The Grave Shift")–11; guest star: season 9)  Langston comes into contact with the CSI team in the course of a murder investigation and joins the Las Vegas Crime Lab as a level I CSI. Working under the leadership of Willows, Langston worries about his genetic makeup and natural predisposition to crime. Langston murders serial killer Nate Haskell during a brutal fight, while rescuing his ex-wife, who had been kidnapped, tortured, and raped by Haskell. Captain Brass is the first police officer at the crime scene. After seeing the condition of Langston's ex-wife he ensures that Haskell's death is ruled as a justifiable homicide by self defense. Langston resigns to care for his traumatized ex-wife, leaving a devastated crime lab in his wake.
 Liz Vassey as Wendy Simms, a DNA technician (regular: season 10; recurring: seasons 6–9; guest star: season 11)  Simms worked in San Francisco before moving to Las Vegas to take the DNA tech position left vacant by Sanders. Hodges complains that she thinks she's "too cool" for the lab, as like Sanders, she expresses a desire to work in the field. She later becomes a crime-scene investigator in Portland to be closer to her sister. Simms had a brief relationship with Hodges.
 David Berman as David Phillips, the assistant medical examiner (regular: seasons 10–15, "Immortality"; recurring: seasons 1–9) David, known as "Super Dave", is the assistant coroner to Chief Medical Examiner Al Robbins. He received his self-styled nickname after saving the life of a victim during an autopsy. Though early in the series, his co-workers tease him about his supposed lack of social experience, he later marries and has a child. He is very close friends with his mentor, Robbins.
 Ted Danson as D.B. Russell, the graveyard shift CSI Supervisor and director of the Las Vegas Crime Lab (regular: seasons 12–15, "Immortality")  Russell is a skilled botanist and veteran crime scene investigator. Previously a crime lab director in Washington, Russell is hired to "clean house" in the wake of the Langston scandal. Russell becomes director of the Las Vegas Crime Lab, a position he holds until his departure following the events of "Immortality". He is married and has four children and a granddaughter. Cathrine Willows returns and succeeds him as director.
 Elisabeth Harnois as Morgan Brody, a CSI level III (regular: seasons 12–15, "Immortality"; guest star: season 11)  Brody is a former member of LAPD SID and joins the Las Vegas PD CSI unit in the wake of the Nate Haskell scandal. She is the estranged daughter of Sheriff Conrad Ecklie, with whom she has a turbulent relationship. Brody is often seen partnered with Sanders, and she forms a strong friendship with Hodges, describing him as her "best friend." She is a skilled investigator.
 Elisabeth Shue as Julie Finlay, the graveyard shift CSI assistant supervisor (regular: seasons 12 (from episode 14, "Seeing Red"–15)  Finlay, known as "Finn" or "Jules," is a blood-spatter specialist who worked for Russell in Seattle; Russell asks her to leave Seattle to join the Las Vegas CSI crew. Finlay is hired following the departure of Willows and acts as a foil to D.B.'s laid-back management style. She is later attacked by the Gig Harbor killer and left in a car trunk. After a short time in a coma, she succumbs to her injuries. Russell states that she will remain with him wherever he goes.
 Jon Wellner as Henry Andrews, a DNA and toxicology technician (regular: seasons 13–15, "Immortality"; recurring: seasons 5–12)  Henry is the toxicology specialist of the Las Vegas Forensics Laboratory, who mainly deals with identifying toxic substances that have undergone human consumption. He later cross-trains as a DNA specialist, replacing Simms. Andrews has a strong bond with all the lab rats, though particularly Hodges, with whom he has had a love–hate relationship. However, the two were seen having a much better relationship in later seasons.

Episodes

Spin-offs

Franchise

From CSI, CBS produced a franchise starting in 2002 with a spin-off entitled CSI: Miami. Set in Miami, Florida, and starring David Caruso and Emily Procter, Miami later launched CSI: NY in 2004. Starring Gary Sinise, Sela Ward, and Melina Kanakaredes, NY was set in New York City and was based upon the idea that "Everything Is Connected." In 2015, a fourth CSI series, CSI: Cyber, starring Patricia Arquette and Ted Danson, was created. It focuses on the FBI's Cyber Crime Division. The CSI series exists within the same fictional "universe" as fellow CBS police dramas Without a Trace and Cold Case. A number of comic books, video games, and novels based on the series have been made.

CSI: The Experience

In 2006, the Fort Worth Museum of Science and History developed a traveling museum exhibit, CSI: The Experience. On May 25, 2007, Chicago's Museum of Science and Industry was the first museum to host the exhibit, and the exhibit's opening featured stars from the TV series. Also a supporting website designed for the benefit of people who cannot visit the exhibit was developed, designed by Rice University's Center for Technology in Teaching and Learning and Left Brain Media. CSI: The Experience also has an interactive attraction at the MGM Grand Las Vegas in Las Vegas, and the Mall of America in Minneapolis, Minnesota.

CSI: Vegas

On February 10, 2020, CBS announced that a limited series revival of CSI was in the works at CBS. Filming was said to possibly begin in late 2020, with William Petersen and Jorja Fox reprising their roles. In February 2021, it was announced that Matt Lauria, Paula Newsome and Mel Rodriguez had joined the cast and the event series was near a series order. On March 31, 2021, it was announced that Mandeep Dhillon had joined the cast, and also Wallace Langham would be reprising his role, along with a series order. In May 2021, it was announced that Jamie McShane had joined the cast in a recurring role, and also Paul Guilfoyle would be reprising his role.

Reception

Critical and commercial reception
During its 15 years in production, CSI secured an estimated world audience of over 73.8 million viewers (in 2009), commanded, as of the fall of 2008, an average cost of $262,600 for a 30-second commercial, and reached milestone episodes including the 100th ("Ch-Ch-Changes"), the 200th ("Mascara") and the 300th ("Frame by Frame"). CSI spawned three spin-off series, a book series, several video games, and an exhibit at Chicago's Museum of Science and Industry. At the time of its cancellation, CSI was the seventh-longest-running scripted US primetime TV series overall and had been recognized as the most popular dramatic series internationally by the Festival de Télévision de Monte-Carlo, which awarded the series the International Television Audience Award (Best Television Drama Series) three times. CSI became the second-most watched show on American television by 2002, finally taking the top position for the 2002–2003 season. It was later named the most watched show in the world for the sixth time in 2016, making it the most watched show for more years than any other show.

Critical reception to the show has been positive. Early reviews of the opening season were mixed.  The Hollywood Reporter noted of the pilot "...the charismatic William Petersen and the exquisite Marg Helgenberger, lend credibility to the portrayals that might be indistinct in lesser hands. There's also a compelling, pulsating edge at the outset of CSI that commands instant attention, thanks in part to dynamic work from director Danny Cannon." Entertainment Weekly gave the opening two seasons "B+" and "A-" ratings, respectively, noting: "The reason for CSI's success is that it combines a few time-tested TV elements in a fresh way. Each episode presents a murder case and a group of lovable heroes armed with cool, high-tech gadgets who do the sleuthing and wrap things up in an hour." The CSI TV series has won six Primetime Emmy awards (out of 39 nominations) and four People's Choice awards (out of six nominations) and was nominated for six Golden Globe Awards, among other awards.

According to TV media critic Liv Hausken, crime drama T.V. shows like CSI normalize surveillance. "The absence of any critical distance to technology on CSI involves a lack of reflection on the security of information (that is, the constant risk of losing sensitive data) and the potential use and misuse of information. This can be contrasted with a whole range of crime series that may rely heavily on surveillance technologies but nevertheless allow critical reflection as part of the plot as such (showing misinterpretation of data or misuse of surveillance techniques)...This trust in technologies on CSI is important for understanding the status of surveillance in this fictional universe. It is also an indicator of the show's presentation of power, a third component for consideration in this discussion about how CSI lends a certain normalization of surveillance to everyday life...The series ignores the fact that everyone is a cultural being, that each person sees something as something, that they understand things from particular perspectives in everyday life as well as in science."

Nielsen Ratings

Public reaction
CSI was often criticized for its level and explicitness of graphic violence, images, and sexual content. The CSI series and its spin-off shows have been accused of pushing the boundary of what is considered acceptable viewing for primetime network television. The series had numerous episodes centered on sexual fetishism and other forms of sexual pleasure (notably the recurring character of Lady Heather, a professional dominatrix). CSI was ranked among the worst primetime shows by the Parents Television Council from its second through sixth seasons, being ranked the worst show for family prime-time viewing after the 2002–2003 and 2005–2006 seasons. The PTC also targeted certain CSI episodes for its weekly "Worst TV Show of the Week" feature. In addition, the episode "King Baby" that aired in February 2005, which the PTC named the most offensive TV show of the week, also led the PTC to start a campaign to file complaints with the FCC with the episode; to date, nearly 13,000 PTC members complained to the Federal Communications Commission about the episode. The PTC also asked Clorox to pull their advertisements from CSI and CSI: Miami because of the graphically violent content on those programs.

A grassroots campaign started in August 2007, upon rumors of Jorja Fox leaving the show, organized by the online forum Your Tax Dollars At Work. Many of its 19,000 members donated to the cause, collecting over $8,000 for gifts and stunts targeted at CBS executives and CSI's producers and writers. The stunts included a wedding cake delivery to Carol Mendelsohn, 192 chocolate-covered insects with the message "CSI Without Sara Bugs Us" to Naren Shankar, and a plane flying several times over the Universal Studios of Los Angeles with a "Follow the evidence keep Jorja Fox on CSI" banner. Other protests included mailing the show's producers a dollar, to save Fox's contract "one dollar at a time." By October 16, 2007, according to the site's tally, more than 20,000 letters with money or flyers had been mailed to the Universal Studios and to CBS headquarters in New York from 49 different countries since the campaign started on September 29, 2007. Fox and Mendelsohn chose to donate the money to Court Appointed Special Advocate, a national association that supports and promotes court-appointed advocates for abused or neglected children.

On September 27, 2007, after CSI'''s season eight premiered, a miniature model of character Gil Grissom's office (which he was seen building during season seven) was put up on eBay. The auction ended October 7, with the prop being sold for $15,600; CBS donated the proceeds to the National Court Appointed Special Advocate Association.

Law enforcement reaction
Real-life crime scene investigators and forensic scientists warn that popular television shows like CSI (often specifically citing CSI) do not give a realistic picture of the work, wildly distorting the nature of crime scene investigators' work, and exaggerating the ease, speed, effectiveness, drama, glamour, influence, scope, and comfort level of their jobs, which they describe as far more mundane, tedious, limited, and boring, and very commonly failing to solve a crime.Stanton, Dawn (quoting Robert Shaler, Ph.D., prof. of biochemistry and molecular biology, dir., forensic science program, Penn. State Univ. formerly at Pittsburgh Crime Laboratory, New York City Office of Chief Medical Examiner, and Lifecodes Corp (nation's first forensic DNA laboratory)), "Probing Question: Is forensic science on TV accurate?," November 10, 2009, Eberly College of Science, Penn. State Univ., retrieved May 31, 2017Jones, Elka (quoting several law enforcement professionals, including crime scene investigators and forensic experts), "Crimefighting and crimesolving programs: Assault on authenticity" in "As seen on TV: Reality vs. fantasy in occupational portrayals on the small screen," Fall, 2003, Occupational Outlook Quarterly, Bureau of Labor Statistics, US Department of Labor, Washington, D.C., retrieved June 1, 2017

Another criticism of the show is the depiction of police procedure, which some consider to be decidedly lacking in realism. For instance, the show's characters not only investigate ("process") crime scenes, but they also conduct raids, engage in suspect pursuit and arrest, interrogate suspects, and solve cases, all of which falls under the responsibility of uniformed officers and detectives, not CSI personnel. Although "some" detectives are also registered CSIs, this is exceedingly rare in real life. It is considered an inappropriate and improbable practice to allow CSI personnel to be involved in detective work, as it would compromise the impartiality of scientific evidence and would be impracticably time-consuming. Additionally, it is inappropriate for the CSIs who process a crime scene to be involved in the examination and testing of any evidence collected from that scene. CSI shares this characteristic with the similar British drama series Silent Witness.

However, not all law enforcement agencies have been as critical; many real CSI investigators have responded positively to the show's influence and enjoy their new reputation. In the UK, scenes of crime officers now commonly refer to themselves as CSIs. Some constabularies, such as those in Norfolk, have even gone so far as to change the name of their crime scene unit to "CSI". CSI recruitment and training programs have also seen an increase in applicants as a result of the show, with a wider range of people now interested in something previously regarded as a scientific backwater.

CSI effect

The "CSI effect" is the alleged phenomenon of CSI raising crime victims' and jury members' real-world expectations of forensic science, especially crime scene investigation and DNA testing. This is said to have changed the way that many trials are presented today, in that prosecutors are pressured to deliver more forensic evidence in court. Victims and their families are coming to expect instant answers from showcased techniques such as DNA analysis and fingerprinting, when actual forensic processing often takes days or weeks, with no guarantee of revealing a "smoking gun" for the prosecution's case. District attorneys state that the conviction rate has decreased in cases with little physical evidence, largely due to the influence of CSI on jury members. Some police and district attorneys have criticized the show for giving the public an inaccurate perception of how police solve crimes.

In 2006, the evidence cited in support of the supposed effect was mainly anecdotes from law enforcement personnel and prosecutors, and, allegedly, little empirical examination had been done on the effect. The one study published by then suggested that the phenomenon might be an urban myth. However, more recent research suggests that these modern TV shows do have an influence on public perceptions and expectations, and on juror behavior.Alldredge, John "The 'CSI Effect' and Its Potential Impact on Juror Decisions," (2015) Themis: Research Journal of Justice Studies and Forensic Science: Vol. 3: Iss. 1, Article 6., retrieved May 31, 2017 One researcher has suggested screening jurors for the level of influence that such TV programs has had.

Accolades

Awards
ASCAP Awards
 2006: Top TV Series 
 2009: Top Television Series
 2013: Top Television Series

ASC Awards
 2005: Outstanding Achievement in Cinematography in Regular Series
 2006: Outstanding Achievement in Cinematography in Regular Series
 2009: Outstanding Achievement in Cinematography in Regular Series

BMI Film & TV Awards
 2001: BMI TV Music Award
 2002: BMI TV Music Award
 2003: BMI TV Music Award
 2004: BMI TV Music Award
 2005: BMI TV Music Award
 2008: BMI TV Music Award
 2009: BMI TV Music Award
 2013: BMI TV Music Award

Cinema Audio Society Awards
 2008: Outstanding Achievement in Sound Mixing for Television Series (for "Living Doll")

Emmys
 2002: Outstanding Makeup for a Series (Non-Prosthetic)
 2003: Outstanding Sound Editing for a Series
 2006: Outstanding Cinematography for a Single-Camera Series
 2007: Outstanding Sound Mixing for a Comedy or Drama Series
 2010: Outstanding Cinematography for a One Hour Series
 2010: Outstanding Special Visual Effects for a Series

Environmental Media Awards
 2011: Television Episodic Drama

Genesis Awards
 2006: Dramatic Series

Golden Reel Awards
 2002: Best Sound Editing in Television – Effects & Foley, Episodic 
 2004: Best Sound Editing in Television Episodic – Sound Effects & Foley

Logie Awards
 2004: Most Popular Overseas Drama

Monte-Carlo Television Festival
 2006: International TV Audience Award, Best Drama TV Series
 2007: International TV Audience Award, Best Drama TV Series
 2008: International TV Audience Award, Best Drama TV Series
 2010: International TV Audience Award, Best Drama TV Series
 2011: International TV Audience Award, Best Drama TV Series
 2012: International TV Audience Award, Best Drama TV Series
 2016: International TV Audience Award, Best Drama TV Series

NAACP Image Awards
 2003: Outstanding Supporting Actor in a Drama Series: Gary Dourdan 
 2006: Outstanding Supporting Actor in a Drama Series: Gary Dourdan

People's Choice Awards
 2003: Favorite Television Dramatic Series
 2004: Favorite Television Dramatic Series
 2005: Favorite Television Drama
 2006: Favorite Television Drama

Producers Guild of America
 2001: Vision Award (Television)

Satellite Awards
 2003: Best Television Series, Drama

Saturn Awards
 2004: Best Network Television Series

Screen Actors Guild Awards
 2005: Outstanding Performance by an Ensemble in a Drama Series

TP de Oro
 2003: Best Foreign Series (Mejor Serie Extranjera)
 2004: Best Foreign Series (Mejor Serie Extranjera)

TV Guide Awards
 2001: New Series of the Year

TV Quick Awards
 2006: Best International TV Show

Visual Effects Society Awards
 2010: Outstanding Supporting Visual Effects in a Broadcast Program
 2010: Outstanding Compositing in a Broadcast Program or Commercial

Nominations
Emmy Awards
 2001: Outstanding Art Direction for a Single Camera Series
 2001: Outstanding Lead Actress in a Drama Series: Marg Helgenberger
 2001: Outstanding Single Camera Picture Editing for a Series
 2001: Outstanding Sound Editing for a Series 
 2002: Outstanding Cinematography for a Single-Camera Series
 2002: Outstanding Drama Series
 2002: Outstanding Makeup for a Series (Prosthetic)
 2002: Outstanding Single Camera Sound Mixing for a Series
 2002: Outstanding Sound Editing for a Series
 2003: Outstanding Drama Series
 2003: Outstanding Lead Actress in a Drama Series: Marg Helgenberger
 2003: Outstanding Makeup for a Series (Non-Prosthetic)
 2003: Outstanding Makeup for a Series (Prosthetic)
 2003: Outstanding Single-Camera Sound Mixing For A Series
 2004: Outstanding Cinematography for a Single-Camera Series
 2004: Outstanding Drama Series
 2004: Outstanding Makeup for a Series (Non-Prosthetic)
 2004: Outstanding Single-Camera Sound Mixing for a Series
 2005: Outstanding Directing for a Drama Series: Quentin Tarantino
 2005: Outstanding Makeup for a Series (Non-Prosthetic)
 2005: Outstanding Single-Camera Sound Mixing for a Series
 2005: Outstanding Sound Editing for a Series
 2006: Outstanding Single-Camera Sound Mixing for a Series
 2006: Outstanding Sound Editing for a Series
 2007: Outstanding Cinematography for a Single-Camera Series
 2007: Outstanding Makeup for a Series (Non-Prosthetic)
 2007: Outstanding Music Composition for a Series
 2007: Outstanding Prosthetic Makeup for a Series, Miniseries, Movie or a Special
 2008: Outstanding Makeup for a Single-Camera Series (Non-Prosthetic)
 2008: Outstanding Sound Editing for a Series
 2009: Outstanding Cinematography for a One Hour Series
 2009: Outstanding Prosthetic Makeup for a Series, Miniseries, Movie or a Special
 2009: Outstanding Sound Editing for a Series

Golden Globes
 2001: Best TV-Series – Drama
 2002: Best Performance by an Actress in a Television Series – Drama: Marg Helgenberger
 2002: Best Television Series – Drama
 2003: Best Performance by an Actress in a Television Series – Drama: Marg Helgenberger
 2004: Best Performance by an Actor in a Television Series – Drama: William Petersen
 2004: Best Television Series – Drama

People's Choice
 2012: Favorite TV Crime Drama
 2013: Favorite TV Crime Drama

Saturn Awards
 2005: Best Network Television Series

Merchandise

DVD releases

Region 1

The US box sets are released by CBS DVD (distributed by Paramount), while the Canadian box sets are released by Alliance Atlantis (distributed by Universal Studios). The first season DVD release differs from all subsequent seasons in that it is available only in 1.33:1 or 4:3 full frame, rather than the subsequent aspect ratio of 1.78:1 or 16:9 widescreen, which is the HDTV standard aspect ratio.

The first season is also the only DVD release of the series not to feature Dolby Digital 5.1 surround audio, instead offering Dolby Digital stereo sound.

The Blu-ray Disc release of season one is 7.1 DTS sound and 1.78:1 widescreen.

Regions 2 and 4
Regions 2 and 4 releases followed a pattern whereby each season was progressively released in two parts (each of 11 or 12 episodes [except for Season 8, in which part 1 contained 8 episodes and the Without a Trace crossover and part 2 contained the remaining 9 episodes] with special features split up) before finally being sold as a single box set.

* = Re-released in slimline full-season packaging. Seasons 1–8 were released in two parts between 2003 and 2009.

Season One is the only season in 4:3 with the remaining seasons in 16:9. All seasons including Season One are in Dolby Digital 5.1.

Blu-ray releases
CBS Home Entertainment (distributed by Paramount) released the first season on high-definition Blu-ray Disc on May 12, 2009.
Unlike its DVD counterpart, this release is in its original 16:9 widescreen format and features 7.1 surround sound. Features on the Season 1 BD set are also in high definition.

Season 10 was released on November 18, 2011, in region B. Like the season 1 Blu-ray release, it features a 16:9 widescreen transfer, but it only has DTS-HD 5.1 sound.

Season 9 was released on September 1, 2009. Like the season 1 Blu-ray release, it features a 16:9 widescreen transfer with DTS-HD Master Audio 7.1 surround sound. Extras include commentaries, featurettes and BD-Live functionality.

Season 8 was released on Blu-ray on May 29, 2009, in region B.

Other releasesCSI has also been released as a series of mobile games. In Fall 2007, CBS teamed up with game developer Gameloft to bring CSI to mobile phones. The first of the series to be published was CSI: Miami. The game features actual cast members such as Alexx Woods and Calleigh Duquesne who are trying to solve a murder in South Beach with the player's assistance. The game is also available for download on various iPod devices.

In spring 2008, Gameloft and CBS released "CSI: Crime Scene Investigation – The Mobile Game" which is based on the original series in Las Vegas. This game introduces the unique ability to receive calls during the game to provide tips and clues about crime scenes and evidence. As for the storyline, the game developers collaborated with Anthony E. Zuiker (the series creator) to ensure that the plot and dialogue were aligned with the show's style.

Books

 True Stories of CSI: The Real Crimes Behind the Best Episodes of the Popular TV Show (published August 2009)—Katherine Ramsland follows the evidence and revisits some of the most absorbing episodes of the phenomenally popular CSI television franchise, and explores the real-life crimes that inspired them. She also looks into the authenticity of the forensic investigations recreated for the dramatizations, and the painstaking real-life forensic process employed in every one of the actual cases—from notorious mass murderer Richard Speck, through the massacre of Buddhist monks in an Arizona Temple, to a baffling case of apparent spontaneous combustion.

Comic books

 In 2003, comic book publisher IDW Publishing began releasing a series of one-shots & miniseries based on all three CSI series, with the majority being based on the original Vegas-based series.
 In September 2009, Tokyopop released a manga version of CSI written by Sekou Hamilton and drawn by Steven Cummings. It centers around five teenagers working at the Las Vegas Crime Lab as interns as they try to solve a murder case of a student at their high school, which leads to a shocking discovery. Grissom and Catherine are seen now and then, as well as other CSI characters.

Video games
Nine video games based on CSI: Crime Scene Investigation have been created. Three games based on the spin-off series CSI: Miami and one for the CSI: NY series have also been created. Radical Entertainment, under its 369 Interactive banner, developed the CSI games until 2004. Telltale Games has been developing the games for the franchise since. Ubisoft has published all of the CSI video games.

International broadcastCSI airs on the Nine Network and TVHits (formerly TV1) in Australia, on Channel 5 in United Kingdom, on CTV in Canada, on RecordTV in Brazil, on Italia 1 in Italy, on Prime in New Zealand, on RTÉ2 in Ireland, on TF1 in France, AXN in Asia and Latin America, Skai TV in Greece, on HOT Zone in Israel, on TV3 in Estonia and Latvia, on TVNorge in Norway and on Kanal 5 in Sweden and Denmark and on GEM TV in Iran.

See also

The use of forensic science in the investigation of crime has been the central theme of several other TV mystery-suspense dramas, including:

 Wojeck, Canada (CBC), 1966
 The Expert, UK (BBC), 1968
 Police Surgeon, Canada (CTV), 1972
 Quincy, M.E., US (NBC), 1976
 Silent Witness, UK (BBC), 1996
 Waking the Dead, UK (BBC), 2000
 Crossing Jordan, US (NBC), 2001
 Bones, US (Fox), 2005
 Body of Proof, US (ABC), 2011
 Coroner, Canada (CBC), 2019

 Explanatory notes 

References

External links

 
 CSI at TV Guide''
 

 
2000 American television series debuts
2015 American television series endings
2000s American crime drama television series
2000s American mystery television series
2000s American police procedural television series
2010s American crime drama television series
2010s American mystery television series
2010s American police procedural television series
Crime thriller television series
CBS original programming
Channel 5 (British TV channel) original programming
English-language television shows
Nielsen ratings winners
Outstanding Performance by an Ensemble in a Drama Series Screen Actors Guild Award winners
Saturn Award-winning television series
Television series by Alliance Atlantis
Television series by CBS Studios
Television shows set in Nevada
Television shows set in the Las Vegas Valley
Television shows filmed in Nevada
Television shows shot in the Las Vegas Valley
Television shows filmed in Santa Clarita, California
Television shows filmed in Los Angeles
Television series created by Anthony E. Zuiker
Fictional portrayals of the Las Vegas Metropolitan Police Department
Television shows featuring audio description
Television shows adapted into comics